William Henry Bishop (October 22, 1900 – February 14, 1956) was an American Major League Baseball pitcher. He played for the Philadelphia Athletics during the  season.

References

Major League Baseball pitchers
Philadelphia Athletics players
Baseball players from Pennsylvania
1900 births
1956 deaths
Scottdale Scotties players